Md. Anwarul Azim Anar is a Bangladesh Awami League politician and the incumbent Member of Parliament from Jhenaidah-4.

Early life 
Anar was born on 3 January 1968.

Career 
Anar was elected to Parliament on 5 January 2014 from Jhenaidah-4 as a Bangladesh Awami League candidate. He is a member of the Parliamentary Standing Committee on the Shipping Ministry.

References 

1968 births
Living people
People from Jhenaidah District
Awami League politicians
10th Jatiya Sangsad members
11th Jatiya Sangsad members